Dimka Ayuba is a senator in the Federal Republic of Nigeria representing the Plateau Central Senatorial District. He previously served as a board member TETFUND North Central Nigeria in the year 2018. He is currently the chairman of the drugs and narcotics committee (2019-2023).

References

Living people
1952 births
21st-century Nigerian politicians